Stefan Milošević (born 4 January 1995) is a Serbian football forward who plays for Canadian Soccer League side Serbian White Eagles FC.

Club career

Serbia 
Born in Raška, Milošević started his career with local club Bane, and later moved to Sloboda Čačak, where he made his senior debut during the 2011–12 season. Playing for youth team of Metalac Gornji Milanovac, as a member of generation which made promotion to the best level Serbian youth league in 2014, he was the best team scorer with 24 goals in 2013–14 season. In summer 2014, he signed his first four-year professional contract with club. Milošević also made 4 Serbian First League matches in 2014. In the winter break off 2014–15 season, Milošević was loaned to Karađorđe Topola. After he returned in Metalac, he was not licensed for the Serbian SuperLiga and later was loaned to Sloga Kraljevo, where he played 8 Serbian League West and 1 cup match. and scored 1 goal, against his ex-club Karađorđe Topola. Ending of 2015, Milošević left Metalac Gornji Milanovac. During the first half of 2016–17 season, Milošević appeared for Drina Zone League side Sloga Sjenica.

At the beginning of 2017, Milošević returned to his home club, Bane, along with his younger brother Nemanja.

Canada 
In February 2022, he signed for Canadian Soccer League side Serbian White Eagles FC. He helped the Serbs in securing the regular-season title including a playoff berth.

Career statistics

References

1995 births
Living people
People from Raška, Serbia
Association football forwards
Serbian footballers
FK Metalac Gornji Milanovac players
FK Karađorđe Topola players
FK Sloga Kraljevo players
Serbian First League players
Serbian White Eagles FC players
FK Bane players
Serbian League players
Canadian Soccer League (1998–present) players